Radaur is a municipal town in Yamunanagar district in the Indian state of Haryana.

Demographics
Radaur was ruled by Sandhu Jats as a princely state in late 18th century. As of 2011 Indian Census, Radaur had a total population of 13,690, of which 7,250 were males and 6,440 were females. Population within the age group of 0 to 6 years was 1,467. The total number of literates in Radaur was 10,380, which constituted 75.8% of the population with male literacy of 78.9% and female literacy of 72.4%. The effective literacy rate of 7+ population of Radaur was 84.9%, of which male literacy rate was 89.5% and female literacy rate was 79.9%. The Scheduled Castes population was 2,410. Radaur had 2794 households in 2011.

 India census, Radaur had a population of 11,737, of which 6,164 were males and 5,573 were females. Population in the age range of 0 to 6 years was 1,397. Radaur had an average literacy rate of 71.5%, male literacy was 75.8%, and female literacy was 66.8%.

Education
Seth Jai Parkash Mukand Lal Institute of Engineering and Technology
Mukand Lal National collage

References

Cities and towns in Yamunanagar district